Katerynivka is a Ukrainian village in the Pokrovsk Raion of the Donetsk Oblast.

Geography
The distance to the district center is about 16 km, and it passes by a local highway.

History
The remains of two Paleolithic settlements have been discovered near the village, which was established in 1700.

During the Holodomor, the village was blacklisted by the government of the Ukrainian Soviet Socialist Republic, which blockaded Kateryniv, causing mass starvation.

Out of the 270 residents that fought in World War II, 187 died on the Eastern Front. 143 of them received posthumous honours and a monument to the fallen was erected in 1968.

Economy
The village has a primarily agricultural economy, centred on the cultivation of grain and the rearing of cattle. Its central estate is a collective farm named after. I. V. Michurin, which holds two cattle farms and two grain farms, spread over 3850 hectares of agricultural land.

The village also has a primary school, a post office and a shopping center.

Demographics
According to the 2001 census, the population of the village was 778 people, of whom 90.1% stated that their mother tongue was Ukrainian, 9.38% - Russian, and 0.26% - Belarusian.

Famous people
Foma Kozhyn - commander of the machine-gun regiment in the Revolutionary Insurgent Army of Ukraine
Yakov Maskalevsky - insurgent commander during the Ukrainian War of Independence
 (1913-2001) - officer in the Soviet Army during World War II

Reference

17th-century establishments in Ukraine
Blackboard places
Villages in Pokrovsk Raion